Sclerocarya is a genus of plants in the family Anacardiaceae.

There are two species:

 Sclerocarya birrea (A.Rich.) Hochst. — sub-Saharan Africa, Madagascar
S. birrea subsp. caffra (Sond.) Kokwaro
S. birrea subsp. multifoliolata (Engl.) Kokwaro
S. birrea subsp. birrea
 Sclerocarya gillettii Kokwaro — eastern Kenya

References

 
Anacardiaceae genera
Taxonomy articles created by Polbot